Sporting Clube de Portugal, otherwise referred to as Sporting CP, or simply as Sporting (particularly within Portugal), or as Sporting Lisbon in other countries, is a Portuguese professional sports club based in Lisbon. It is best known for the professional football team playing in the Primeira Liga, the top flight of Portuguese football.

Founded on 1 July 1906, Sporting is one of the "Big Three" clubs in Portugal that have never been relegated from Primeira Liga, along with rivals Benfica and Porto. Sporting are nicknamed Leões (Lions), for the symbol used in the middle of the club's crest, and Verde e Brancos (Green and Whites), for the shirt colour that are in (horizontal) stripes. Their home ground has been the Estádio José Alvalade, built in 2003, which replaced the previous one, built in 1956. The club's anthem is called "A Marcha do Sporting" ("Sporting's March", written in 1955) and its supporters are called Sportinguistas. Sporting are the second largest sports club by membership in Portugal, with more than 160,000 members.

Sporting are the third most decorated Portuguese football team, with 54 major trophies. Domestically, they have won 19 League titles, 17 Taças de Portugal, a joint-record of 4 Campeonato de Portugal, 4 Taças da Liga and 9 Supertaças Cândido de Oliveira. In Europe, they won the 1963–64 European Cup Winners' Cup and were runners-up at the UEFA Cup in 2005. Sporting played in the first European Champions Cup match, on 4 September 1955, by invitation and has participated in the most editions of UEFA Cup/UEFA Europa League (32), a tournament in which they have the second most matches played and won, and where they are ranked 2nd in the all-time club ranking.

History

Foundation (1902–1906)
Sporting Clube de Portugal has its origins in June 1902, when young men Francisco da Ponte, Horta Gavazzo and his brother José Maria decided to create Sport Club de Belas. This club, the first ancestor of Sporting, played just one match and at the end of the year's summer, disbanded. Two years later, the idea of creating a football club was revived, and this time, with the Gavazzo brothers joined by José Alvalade (José Holtreman Roquette) and José Stromp: a new club, the Campo Grande Football Club, was founded. They played their matches on the estate of the Viscount of Alvalade (Alfredo Holtreman), José Alvalade's grandfather, with the club's headquarters located in Francisco Gavazzo's home.  For two years, the club developed an intense activity on several sports, namely football, tennis and fencing. The club also organized parties and picnics. Eventually, during one picnic, on 12 April 1906, discussions erupted, as some members defended that the club should only be focused on organizing picnics and social events, with another group defending that the club should be focused on the practising of sports instead. Some time later, José Gavazzo, José Alvalade and 17 other members left the club, with the latter saying, "I am going to have with me my grandfather and he will give me the money to make another club." As such, a new club, Sporting Clube de Portugal, was founded. The Viscount of Alvalade, whose money helped found the club, was the first president of Sporting. José Alvalade, as one of the main founders, uttered on behalf of himself and his fellow co-founders, "We want this club to be a great club, as great as the greatest in Europe." Three months later, on 1 July 1906, António Félix da Costa Júnior suggested the name Sporting Clube de Portugal, and this date is considered the official day Sporting was founded.

Early years (1907–1946)
The year 1907 marked some "firsts" for the club, as Sporting played the first football match of their history on 3 February, ending in a 5–1 defeat against third division club Cruz Negra; inaugurated their first ground, known as "Sítio das Mouras" (the most advanced in Portugal at the time, equipped with showers, two tennis courts, an athletics track and a football field) on 4 July; and played the first derby of all time against local rivals S.L. Benfica (then known as Grupo Sport Lisboa) on 1 December.

The club also released their first report card on 31 March 1922, titled "Boletim do Sporting" (Sporting's Report), lending the foundation for the later called "Jornal do Sporting", the official newspaper of the club, that still exists today.

Sporting played their first Primeira Liga game (the 1st Division of Portuguese football) ever on 20 January 1935, winning 0–6 against Académica de Coimbra. A year later, in 1936, the club had their heaviest ever defeat against Porto, losing 10–1. Sporting, however, got their revenge a year later, when they humbled the same team with a 9–1 result. In 1941, under the guidance of Hungarian manager József Szabó, the club celebrated the first league title of their history.

Golden years and fading (1946–1982)

The football team had their height during the 1940s and 1950s. It was spearheaded by Fernando Peyroteo, José Travassos, Albano Pereira, Jesus Correia and Manuel Vasques, in a quintet nicknamed "The Five Violins". With the violins' help, Sporting won seven league titles in eight seasons between 1947 and 1954, including a then unprecedented four in a row from 1950 to 1951 onwards. Fernando Peyroteo, the most known of "the violins", is considered one of the greatest Portuguese players of all time.

Sporting and the Yugoslavian team Partizan both made history on 4 September 1955, as they played the first-ever UEFA Champion Clubs' Cup match. Sporting player João Martins scored the first-ever goal of the competition, on the 14th minute. The match ended in a 3–3 draw. Sporting also inaugurated their new venue, José Alvalade Stadium, on 10 June 1956, which would be their home ground until 2003.

In the 1960s, Sporting achieved continental success, winning the 1963–64 UEFA Cup Winners' Cup, defeating MTK Budapest of Hungary in the final. It was the only time a Portuguese team side won a UEFA Cup Winners' Cup title. The team entered the competition defeating Atalanta in the qualifying round, then past Cypriot club APOEL in what was the biggest win in a single UEFA competitions game to date: 16–1, a record that still stands today. On the next round, they lost 4–1 to Manchester United at Old Trafford in the first hand, but made a remarkable comeback at home, winning 5–0. In the semi-finals, Sporting eliminated Lyon, and in the end MTK Budapest, in a two-round final to win their first European title. The winning goal was scored by João Morais from a direct corner kick. The club reached the semi-finals of the Cup Winners' Cup in 1974, but lost to eventual winners 1. FC Magdeburg of East Germany.

First league title drought (1982–2000)
English manager Malcolm Allison arrived at Sporting in 1981, and under his guidance the club won the domestic double (league title and Portuguese cup), in 1982. In the years between 1982 and 2000, Sporting suffered from a drought of titles. Despite defeating rivals Benfica 4–0 on aggregate to win the Portuguese Super Cup in 1987, Sporting fans had to wait until 1995 to see their team win some silverware after beating Club Sport Marítimo 2–0 in the final of the 1995 Portuguese Cup. That victory granted Sporting a place in the following season's Portuguese Super Cup. After drawing 0–0 at José Alvalade Stadium and securing a 2–2 draw at Estádio das Antas, a replay match was held on 30 April 1996 at the Parc de Princes in Paris. Sporting won 3–0 with Sá Pinto scoring twice and Carlos Xavier scoring a stoppage time penalty. In the same 1995–96 season, Sporting also reached the Portuguese Cup Final but lost 3–1 to Benfica.

Highlights of this time also include a 7–1 victory over arch-rivals Benfica at the old José Alvalade Stadium on 14 December 1986. Sporting also reached the UEFA Cup semi-final in 1991, losing against Internazionale. Also, Barcelona and Real Madrid were both tied and defeated in Lisbon when playing against Sporting in the old UEFA Cup, in the 1986–87 and 1994–95 seasons, respectively.

The turn of the millennium (2000–2002)
In 2000, Sporting, led by manager Augusto Inácio (a former Sporting player, who replaced Giuseppe Materazzi at the beginning of the season), won the league title on the last match day, with a 4–0 victory over Salgueiros, ending an 18-year drought. In the following season, Sporting conquered the 2000 Super Cup but came third in the league. In the 2001–02 season, led by coach László Bölöni, Sporting conquered their 18th league title, the Portuguese Cup and the 2002 Portuguese Super Cup. On 21 June 2002, the club had opened its training facility, located in Alcochete, 30 km east of Lisbon.

Second league title drought (2002–2021)

2002–2009
Sporting have failed to win Primeira Liga again since 2002. In the 2004–05 season, José Peseiro-led Sporting was leading the Primeira Liga and was trailing a remarkable journey in UEFA Cup. However, at the end of the season, the team eventually lost all the chances of winning any trophy that season: the first set-back had already happened on 26 January 2005 when Sporting was eliminated from Taça de Portugal after losing 7–6 on penalties against Benfica. Nevertheless, Sporting was able to reach the leadership of Primeira Liga, and on 5 May the team booked their second European final, after defeating Dutch team AZ Alkmaar in UEFA Cup. While awaiting the Final, on 14 May, Sporting lost its penultimate match in Primeira Liga against S.L. Benfica and dropped to third place. By the end of the season, the team eventually finished 2004–05 Primeira Liga in that place. Lastly, playing the 2005 UEFA Cup Final at their home ground, on 18 May, Sporting lost 1–3 against Russian side CSKA Moscow, after being 1–0 up at halftime.

Domestically, Sporting had back-to-back wins in the Portuguese Cup in 2007 and 2008 (led by coach Paulo Bento). The club almost reached another European final in 2012, but were dropped out of the competition by Athletic Bilbao, in the semi-finals of the 2011–12 Europa League. Sporting also reached, for the first time, the knockout phase of UEFA Champions League, in the 2008–09 season, but were roundly defeated by FC Bayern Munich, with an aggregate loss of 12–1. This is widely regarded as one of the lowest points in the history of the club.

Finances and 2013 election
After years of financial mismanagement, Sporting had amassed debts exceeding €276 million by 2011. The results on the pitch were also negative, with Sporting finishing seventh in the 2012–13 Primeira Liga, their lowest ever finish. Managerial changes occurred within months or weeks apart: from November 2009 to May 2013, nine managers were contracted, with none of them lasting an entire season. In 2013, after pressure from club members, president Godinho Lopes resigned, and shortly afterwards, Bruno de Carvalho was elected president in a snap election. Carvalho's intentions were to renegotiate the club's debt payment schedule with the banks involved – who by now have pardoned Sporting in millions of euros – and to return success to the football team, while threatening to take Godinho Lopes to court. Carvalho's election brought Angolan investors to the club, most notably Álvaro Sobrinho, through Holdimo, which holds 20 million shares of Sporting's SAD.

On 5 June 2015, it was released an audit that analyzed the management of Sporting in the past 20 years: it concluded that in 1994 the club had €55 million worth of real estate assets and an almost nonexistent debt; by 2013, real estate assets were almost nonexistent, and the club had amassed a €331 million debt. Their new stadium (completed in 2003) cost 74% more than what was expected when its construction started (€184 million against the planned €106 million), while their training facility cost 24% more, and the costs of Alvalade XXI neighbourhood, a real estate complex located around the stadium, overshooted in 60%; such complex was almost entirely sold in the following years, many estates of which were sold below market prices.

From 1995 to 2013, the club invested €261 million in the football team, however, with few sports and financial results. The audit criticized many football transfers in the 2000s, in which the club paid commissions well above market prices to player agents, and discovered that Sporting even had paid commissions without evidence of written contracts. The audit also concluded that the administrations from 1995 to 2013 intended to convert Sporting, a multi-sports club, exclusively into a football club – although they did not openly admitted so – which was being done gradually through the closure of other sport modalities. Moreover, the audit also pointed out evidence of mismanagement and conflicts of interest by several administrators. Considering the audit's results, club members approved the expulsion of Godinho Lopes as an associate of the club in June 2015.

2013–2020
Led by coach Leonardo Jardim in the 2013–14 season, Sporting finished second in the league, thus gaining direct access to the 2014–15 UEFA Champions League, their first Champions League presence in five years.

In the 2014–15 season, Sporting won their 16th Portuguese Cup in dramatic fashion. The Lisbon side, led by Marco Silva, played the final against Braga, and after a disastrous start, found themselves losing 0–2 at half-time and playing with ten men after the sending-off of Cédric Soares. With the final seemingly lost, Islam Slimani gave some hope to the fans as he scored the 1–2 on the 83-minute. In stoppage time, Fredy Montero managed to equalize, forcing extra-time. Sporting ultimately won the match 3–1 on penalties. Celebrations ended in a pacific pitch invasion of Estádio José Alvalade by the fans, as the club touched silverware for the first time in seven years.

In June 2015, Jorge Jesus joined Sporting after Benfica opted not to renew his contract as coach of the club, signing a three-year contract. Presented as the new manager of the club on 1 July, the managerial change took the rivalry of both Lisbon clubs to new heights. Under Jesus' tenure, Sporting won the Portuguese Super Cup for the eighth time, against back-to-back champions Benfica. Despite a positive start, Sporting did not win any other trophy, finishing second in the Primeira Liga with 86 points, two points behind Benfica, despite breaking their own points record in the league.

Following a trophyless season, Sporting won their first Taça da Liga on a penalty shoot-out against Vitória de Setúbal. However, on 15 May, days after finishing third in the league, several players and coaches were attacked by around 50 supporters of Sporting at the club's training ground. Five days later, Sporting lost the Portuguese Cup final to Aves. About a month later,  Bruno de Carvalho was dismissed by club members after a general assembly on 23 June. This followed the rescissions of nine players: Bruno Fernandes, Daniel Podence, Rui Patricio, Rodrigo Battaglia, Rafael Leão, Rúben Ribeiro,  Bas Dost, Gelson Martins and  William Carvalho.

In the period before scheduled elections, a management committee, headed by former President Sousa Cintra, succeeded in returning some of the players who had left the club following the incident, namely Bruno Fernandes, Bas Dost and Rodrigo Battaglia. Frederico Varandas was elected president on 8 September 2018. Having replaced Jorge Jesus at the beginning of the 2018–19 season, José Peseiro was sacked after a poor performance on the Primeira Liga.

In March 2020, Rúben Amorim was appointed manager of Sporting CP for a managerial transfer worth €10 million (£8.65 million), becoming the third-most expensive manager ever.

2020–present 
In the 2020–21 season, with no spectators allowed in Portugal due to the COVID-19 pandemic, and after being eliminated from European competition by LASK Linz, Sporting won their third league cup and ended their 19-year period without winning the Portuguese league, with only one loss (against Benfica in the penultimate round and already as champions), securing their 19th Primeira Liga title after a 1–0 home win against Boavista.

At the 2021–22 UEFA Champions League group stage, Sporting made a comeback by finishing second on Group C after a 5–1 home loss to AFC Ajax and 1–0 away loss to Borussia Dortmund, thereby reaching the knockout phase for only the second time since the 2008–09 season. Domestically, both the 2021 Supertaça Cândido de Oliveira  and the 2021–22 Taça da Liga were won by the Lions, securing the trophies against Braga and Benfica, respectively. In the 2021–22 Primeira Liga, Sporting finished second with the same 85 points as in the previous league campaign.

Crests and motto
Since its formation, Sporting CP's motto is: "effort, dedication, devotion and glory". To keep up with times, the Club's emblem has been modernized throughout history and this led to the development of various crests consistent with the history of the Club: in all of them, the rampant Lion and the color green have always been present in prominence. Since its founding on 1 July 1906, Sporting has already had five emblems, in addition to two commemorating crests for the fiftieth (1956) and the one hundredth years of existence (2006) of the club.

The current emblem presents an image with simplified framing while maintaining the green color in the shield and adding three horizontal white stripes that symbolize the Club's shirt. Complemented with the words 'Sporting' and 'Portugal', now written in full, they emphasize the national dimension of the club and clarify its name internationally. The Lion appears in golden color and the acronym "SCP" is shown like a crown on top of the shield. This crest was adopted in 2001.

Rivalries

Lisbon derby

Sporting's main rivals are Benfica, with both teams contesting the Lisbon derby, also known as "the eternal derby", among other names. The local rivalry started in 1907 when eight Benfica players left for Sporting looking for better training conditions. The first derby was contested that year and ended with a 2–1 win for Sporting. One of Sporting's biggest defeats to Benfica, 7–2, happened at the original Estádio da Luz on 28 April 1948, as well as three 5–0 losses, in 1939, 1978 and 1986. The biggest Sporting win over Benfica, 7–1, occurred at the original Estádio José Alvalade on 14 December 1986. Manuel Fernandes was particularly inspired and scored four goals; Mário Jorge two and Ralph Meade one; Wando scored for Benfica.

Before the start of the 1993–94 season, Sousa Cintra, then president of Sporting, took advantage of Benfica's financial crisis by signing Paulo Sousa and Pacheco, who had terminated their contracts with the latter club. This event became known as "Verão Quente" (Hot Summer). Later, on 14 May 1994, a memorable derby was played at the old José Alvalade Stadium, crowded to the top, as winning the derby could be a decisive step for Sporting in trying to regain the title, which by that time they had not won for 12 years. Sporting were considered the favourites, with a squad composed by Luís Figo, Paulo Sousa, Krasimir Balakov, Ivaylo Yordanov, Emílio Peixe, Stan Valckx, and others; therefore, Benfica were seen as the underdogs. However, Benfica defied the odds and won the match 6–3 and went on securing the league title weeks later, leaving Sporting empty-handed in one of the most dramatic seasons in their history. Two years later, the rivalry continued intense with a dramatic incident in the 1996 Portuguese Cup final, which Benfica won 3–1. After the latter scored the first goal, a supporter of the club lit a flare which eventually struck a Sporting fan in the chest, killing him instantly.

Eight years later, on 3 May 2004, Geovanni's winning goal for Benfica in the 87th minute at Alvalade caused a pitch invasion by Sporting fans. In November 2011, after a 1–0 loss to Benfica at the Estádio da Luz, Sporting supporters set fire to one of the stands of the stadium. Four years later, on 7 February 2015, during a futsal derby, members of No Name Boys, one of Benfica's unofficial supporters' groups, showed a banner saying "Very Light 96", in reference to the 1996 incident. The next day, during a football derby at Estádio José Alvalade, an official supporters' group of Sporting, Juve Leo, showed a banner with the inscription "Sigam o King" ("Follow the King"), in reference to Eusébio's death a month before.

Sporting vs Porto

Sporting has also a rivalry with FC Porto. Outside the sports environment itself, the confrontation between Lions and Dragons represents a form of expression in sport, and in football in particular, of the political and regional differentiation between Lisbon and the North of Portugal. The confrontation captured the national imagination, having been remembered in the film O Leão da Estrela (1947), in which the actor António Silva plays the role of Anastácio, a leonine adept employed in a Lisbon office, who pretends to be a wealthy individual in order to be able to go to Oporto to closely follow a match of the "Sporting dos Cinco Violinos", at a time when competitions in Portuguese football were often decided between the two teams.

Sporting and FC Porto have decided a competition 13 times. The first final won by Sporting took place only in 1978, at Estádio Nacional, counting for the Taça de Portugal. The dispute was decided in two matches, a 1-1 draw and a 2-1 victory in the tie-breaker. There would be three more finals in the same location. In 1994, won by FC Porto also in the tiebreaker, by 2-1. In 2000, won again by FC Porto in a tiebreaker, by 2 to 0. And, in 2007–08 Taça de Portugal, won by Sporting in extra time, by 2-0. In the 2019 , after 11 years, at the final, with a 2-2 draw after extra time and Sporting's 4-3 victory on penalties.

Another four decisions between FC Porto and Sporting were for the Supertaça Cândido de Oliveira. In 1996, in a tie-breaker valid for the 1994/95 edition; in 2001, valid for the 1999/00 edition; and in 2007 and 2008. In the first two finals, the matches were held over two legs in the fields of rivals, with tiebreakers in Paris (1996) and Coimbra (2001). In 2007 and 2008, under the format in force since 2001, the decisions took place in a single match held in Leiria and in the Algarve.

Another decision between the two clubs took place in 2019, counting for the 2018–19 Taça da Liga. The match took place in Braga, ending with a 3-1 victory on penalties, after a 1-1 draw in regular time.

Despite the rivalry, both clubs formed an alliance against Benfica in 2017.

Facilities

Stadium

Throughout its history, Sporting has had several grounds. The first one was inaugurated on 4 July 1907, and was called "Sítio das Mouras".

In 1956, the first Estádio de Alvalade was inaugurated. Sporting played their matches there until 2003, when the stadium was demolished.

In Lisbon, the new stadium, Alvalade XXI ("Estádio José Alvalade"), was built for UEFA Euro 2004, hosted by Portugal. Designed by Tomás Taveira, it was inaugurated on 6 August 2003. The opening match was a 3–1 victory over Manchester United. The stadium was awarded a 'five-star' certificate at 2005 UEFA Cup Final by then UEFA president Lennart Johansson. The stadium has a capacity of 50,095 spectators.

Alvalade XXI hosted quarter-finals and semi-finals matches during the 2019–20 UEFA Champions League.

Youth Academy

The Academy is the center of all Sporting Football activity. It is the place where the Sporting Professional Team has all its daily preparation and also serves as a hub for carrying out internships. It is at the Sporting Professional Academy of Football that Sporting hosts its support staff, which includes the directive, clinical and administrative components. On the other hand, the Academy is also Sporting CP's Sports Training School.

Sporting's youth academy system helped develop Ballon d'Or recipients Luís Figo and Cristiano Ronaldo.

In the victorious campaign of Portuguese National Team in the Euro 2016 10 out of the 14 players who played the final against France were players "made in Sporting". Moreover, at the 2018 FIFA World Cup Sporting CP had 14 players that came through their youth system, making it the most represented youth academy system in the tournament followed by FC Barcelona with 11.

Pavilhão João Rocha

With a total capacity of 3,000 seats, spread over 4 stands and a Corporate area, being the largest indoor arena in terms of sports clubs in national terms. Its dimensions meet the requirements for all collective pavilion sports, with an automatic table system for Roller Hockey, and an advanced video and multimedia system. In the roundabout between the Pavilion and the Stadium, a monument was also inaugurated to evoke the Club. Those who follow the path that surrounds the pavilion will find the Passeio da Fama Walk of Fame, of Sporting former and current athletic glories. Next to the pavilion there are also three 5-a-side football fields, with the aim of complementing the Polo EUL. One of the entrances to the pavilion gives access to Loja Verde and to a branch of the Sporting Museum, with a design more focused on virtual realities and the concept of a museum in real time. There is also an auditorium prepared to host conferences, training courses and special events. The Pavilion and all the surrounding space is prepared to host concerts and cultural events.

Club records

Honours

National

League
 Primeira Liga
 Winners (19): 1940–41, 1943–44, 1946–47, 1947–48, 1948–49, 1950–51, 1951–52, 1952–53, 1953–54, 1957–58, 1961–62, 1965–66, 1969–70, 1973–74, 1979–80, 1981–82, 1999–2000, 2001–02, 2020–21

Cups
 Taça de Portugal
 Winners (17): 1940–41, 1944–45, 1945–46, 1947–48, 1953–54, 1962–63, 1970–71, 1972–73, 1973–74, 1977–78, 1981–82, 1994–95, 2001–02, 2006–07, 2007–08, 2014–15, 2018–19
 Taça da Liga
 Winners (4): 2017–18, 2018–19, 2020–21, 2021–22
 Supertaça Cândido de Oliveira
 Winners (9): 1982, 1987, 1995, 2000, 2002, 2007, 2008, 2015, 2021
 Campeonato de Portugal
 Winners (4): 1922–23, 1933–34, 1935–36, 1937–38

European
 UEFA Cup Winners' Cup
 Winners (1): 1963–64

Players

Current squad

Other players under contract

Out on loan

Player accolades

Portuguese Top Goalscorer
The Portuguese League top scorer was awarded the Silver Shoe from 1934 to 1935 until 1951–52. Since the 1952–53 season, the sports newspaper A Bola awards the Silver Ball prize.

; ;

Player of the Year
The Player of the Year award is named after former player Francisco Stromp, and was instituted from 1992. The list below is a list of winners of the award.

Award winners
Awards received while playing for Sporting CP

European Golden Boot
  Héctor Yazalde (46 goals) – 1974 (Portuguese record)
  Mário Jardel (42 goals) – 2002

African Footballer of the Year
  Emmanuel Amuneke – 1994

Bulgarian Footballer of the Year
  Krasimir Balakov – 1995
  Ivaylo Yordanov – 1998

Algerian Ballon d'Or
  Islam Slimani – 2013

UEFA European Under-21 Championship Golden Player
  Luís Figo – 1994
  William Carvalho – 2015

FIFA U-20 World Cup

Golden Ball
  Emílio Peixe – 1991 Portugal
Silver Ball
  Dani – 1995 Qatar
Bronze Ball
  Paulo Torres – 1991 Portugal

UEFA European Under-17 Championship Golden Player Award
  Miguel Veloso – 2003 Portugal

Portuguese Golden Ball
  Luís Figo – 1994

Portuguese Footballer of the Year
  Rui Jordão1 – 1980
  António Oliveira1 – 1981, 1982
  Jorge Cadete2 −1990
  Luís Figo1; 2 – 1995
  Alberto Acosta2 – 2000
  Mário Jardel1; 2 – 2002

Primeira Liga Breakthrough Player of the Year:
  Miguel Veloso – 2006–07
  William Carvalho – 2013–14
  Pedro Gonçalves – 2020–21

LPFP Primeira Liga Player of the Year:
  Bruno Fernandes – 2017–18
  Bruno Fernandes – 2018–19
  Sebastián Coates – 2020–21

LPFP Primeira Liga Goalkeeper of the Year:
  Rui Patrício – 2011–12, 2015–16, 2017–18
  Antonio Adán – 2020–21

LPFP Primeira Liga Best Goal:
  Jovane Cabral – 2018–19

Segunda Liga Breakthrough Player of the Year:
  Bruma – 2012–13

FIFA World Cup All-Star Team
  Krasimir Balakov – 1994 United States
  Ricardo – 2006 Germany
  Marcos Rojo – 2014 Brazil

The 100 Greatest Players of the 20th Century
  Peter Schmeichel

Former coaches
For details on former coaches, see List of Sporting CP managers.

Media

Newspaper
Jornal Sporting is a weekly newspaper published by Sporting. Beginning its activity as Sporting Club of Portugal Bulletin on 31 March 1922, it was initially an eight-page calendar, with the optional payment of $2 a semester. Under the direction of Artur da Cunha Rosa, the bulletin became known as a newspaper in June 1952.

Sporting TV

Sporting TV is the television channel of Sporting. Open channel, the channel is present in the private operators MEO and NOS, in channels 34 and 35, and in Angola, through the operator ZAP. The channel broadcasts several sporting events linked to Sporting.

Museum
Inaugurated on 31 August 2004, Sporting Museum is divided into several thematic areas that express the wealth of the club's heritage and its sporting achievements over more than a century of existence in thirty-two different modalities. About two thousand trophies are on display, and there are many others in store.

The history of the museum dates back to the trophy room of the old headquarters on Rua do Pasadinho, where in 1956, 1850 trophies were already stored. In 1994, President Sousa Cintra inaugurated a new trophy room, where less than half of the club's collections were exhibited. The following year the remodeling and organization of the museum is promoted, and a conservative is incorporated. During the construction of the new Estádio José Alvalade a new museum is inaugurated, culminating in four years of investigation. Throughout the years, through donations with several origins, in addition to the trophies the patrimony of the club never stopped growing. In July 2016, there was a new inauguration after a total renovation.

Club officials

Directive Board

 President: Frederico Varandas
 Vice-presidents: Carlos Vieira, Vicente Moura, Vítor Silva Ferreira, António Rebelo
 Board members: Bruno Mascarenhas Garcia, Luís Roque, Rui Caeiro, Alexandre Henriques, José Quintela
 Substitutes: Rita Matos, Luís Gestas, Jorge Sanches, Luís Loureiro

General Assembly
 President: Rogério Alves
 Vice-president: Rui Solheiro
 Secretaries: Miguel de Castro, Luís Pereira, Tiago Abade
 Substitutes: Diogo Orvalho, Manuel Mendes, Rui Fernandes

References

External links

  
 Sporting CP at UEFA

 
Companies listed on Euronext Lisbon
Association football clubs established in 1906
Football clubs in Portugal
Publicly traded sports companies
Sport in Lisbon
Sports clubs established in 1906
1906 establishments in Portugal
Unrelegated association football clubs
Taça de Portugal winners
Primeira Liga clubs
UEFA Cup Winners' Cup winning clubs